The 1975 Penn Quakers football team represented the University of Pennsylvania in the 1975 NCAA Division I football season.

Schedule

References

Penn
Penn Quakers football seasons
Penn Quakers football